This is a list of United States ambassadors to Jamaica. The U.S. Embassy is located in Jamaica's capital, Kingston, and was established there on August 16, 1962.

Ambassadors

Notes

See also
Jamaica – United States relations
Foreign relations of Jamaica 
Ambassadors of the United States

References
United States Department of State: Background notes on Jamaica

External links
 United States Department of State: Chiefs of Mission for Jamaica
 United States Department of State: Jamaica
 United States Embassy in Jamaica

 01
United States
Jamaica
Jamaica